Elmer Ellsworth "Bird" Carroll was a professional football player during the early years of the National Football League with the Canton Bulldogs. He attended Washington & Jefferson College.  Caroll won NFL championships with the Canton Bulldogs in 1922 and 1923.

Notes
 

1896 births
1982 deaths
People from Westmoreland County, Pennsylvania
Players of American football from Pennsylvania
Canton Bulldogs players
Washington & Jefferson College alumni
Washington & Jefferson Presidents football players